The 2015 Cook Islands Round Cup is the forty-second recorded season of top flight association football competition in the Cook Islands, with any results between 1951 and 1969, and also in 1986 and 1988–1990 currently unknown. Tupapa Maraerenga won the title by four points from second place finishers Titikaveka. This was Tupapa's second title in a row and the fifth time they had won the Round Cup in the last six seasons.

League table

Results

References

Cook Islands Round Cup seasons
Cook
football